Wadi Ayan is a sub-district located in Harf Sufyan District, 'Amran Governorate, Yemen. Wadi Ayan had a population of 1307 according to the 2004 census.

References 

Sub-districts in Harf Sufyan District